Fort Shepherd is the site of a former Hudson's Bay Company fort in the West Kootenay region of southern British Columbia. The fort was on the west side of the Columbia River, across from the mouth of the Pend-d'Oreille River, southwest of Trail.

References

Ghost towns in British Columbia
Hudson's Bay Company forts